Andrewsornis is an extinct genus of giant flightless predatory birds of the family Phorusrhacidae or "terror birds" that lived in Oligocene Argentina. Fossils have been found in the Sarmiento Formation, and possibly the Agua de la Piedra Formation.

Discovery and naming 
The holotype of Andrewsornis (FM-P13417) was discovered on September 18, 1923 by John Bernard Abbott in Patagonia, who was participating in the "Marshall Field Paleontological Expeditions", a series of expeditions to Argentina and Bolivia from 1922 to 1927 by the Field Museum of Natural History. This holotype consists of: an incomplete skull, the lower jaws, the proximal part of the coracoid and the second and ungual phalanges of digit II from the pes. The fossils date to the Deseadan of the middle-upper Oligocene of the Deseado Formation of Cabeza Blanca (Chubut, Argentina). Two other specimens, a mandibular symphysis and incomplete left femur were collected from strata of the same age in Santa Cruz Province. Bryan Patterson gave these fossils the name Andrewsornis abbotti in 1941, the generic name refers to Charles William Andrews "... as a tribute to the excellence of his research into fossil birds in general and specifically to the Phororhacidae". The species name, abbotti, refers to John Bernard Abbott, the discoverer of the holotype. Patterson described him as "an experienced collector and preparer, whom I am in favor of his instructions on the practical aspects of paleontology."

Description 
Andrewsornis is so far the largest member of the subfamily Patagornithinae, though it has also been found to be a Phorusrhacine. The genus is generally very similar to Phorusrhacos, but differs in that: the skull is slightly flatter, front edge of the antorbital fenestra is strongly sloping, the lower jaw is 39 cm long and slimmer than Phorusrhacos'''. With a length of 10 cm, the symphysis mandibulae is more similar to that in Andalgalornis and Patagornis. The Fenestrae Mandibulares are longer and larger than in Patagornis and Andalgalornis, have an oval shape.

 Classification 
In 2003 during their redescription of phorusrhacidae, Herculano Alvarenga and Elizabeth Hofling created a new subfamily, Patagornithinae, with Patagornis as the type genus, that included Andrewsornis and Andalgalornis. Andrewsornis is similar to Patagornis and Andalgalornis in that they all are medium-sized phorusrhacids with slender, lightly built bodies, long and narrow mandibular symphyses, and long and slender tibiotarsi and tarsometatarsi. However, a phylogenetic analysis in 2015 by Degrange et al found Andrewsornis in a merged Phorusrhacinae and in polytomy with Physornis and Phorusrhacos as well. The following phylogenetic tree shows the internal relationships of Phorusrhacidae under the exclusion of Brontornis as published by Degrange and colleagues in 2015, which recovers a clade that contains Physornis, Phorusrhacos and Andalgalornis'', among others.

References

External links 
 Genus Taxonomy

Phorusrhacidae
Extinct flightless birds
Oligocene birds
Paleogene birds of South America
Deseadan
Paleogene Argentina
Neogene Argentina
Fossils of Argentina
Fossil taxa described in 1941
Golfo San Jorge Basin
Sarmiento Formation